The Sheep River is located in southwestern Alberta, Canada, and is part of the Bow River watershed.  The river begins in the mountain valleys of Elbow-Sheep Wildland Provincial Park, passes through Sheep River Provincial Park, and joins the Highwood River about 8 km east of Okotoks. The Sheep River provides drinking water for the towns of Diamond Valley, and Okotoks.

Tributaries
From origin to mouth, the Sheep River receives water from the following tributaries:
Rae Creek (from Mount Rae)
Burns Creek
Cliff Creek
Junction Creek
Bluerock Creek
Gorge Creek
Dyson Creek
March Creek
Coal Creek
Wolf Creek
Long Prairie Creek
Macabee Creek
Waite Valley Creek
Lineham Creek
Turner Valley
Threepoint Creek
Spring Creek
Wilson Coulee

See also 
 List of rivers of Alberta

References

External links
 Sheep River Wildlife Sanctuary

Rivers of Alberta
Okotoks